Dietzia aerolata is a Gram-positive, coccoid and non-spore-forming bacterium from the genus Dietzia which has been isolated from air from a duck barn in Berlin in Germany.

References

External links
Type strain of Dietzia aerolata at BacDive -  the Bacterial Diversity Metadatabase	

Mycobacteriales
Bacteria described in 2010